The 2011–12 Mississippi State basketball team represented Mississippi State University in the 2011–12 college basketball season. The team's head coach was Rick Stansbury, in his fourteenth and final season. The team played their home games at Humphrey Coliseum in Starkville, Mississippi, and was a member of the Southeastern Conference.

Pre-season
The Bulldogs posted a record of 17–14 (9–7 SEC) in the 2010–11 season and finished second in the SEC Western Division. The Bulldogs lost three starters and four other lettermen. They also brought in five freshman recruits, finishing twelfth in Rivals.com team recruiting rankings.

Class of 2011 signees

Roster

Source: 2011–12 Roster

Depth chart

Schedule and results

|-
!colspan=12| Exhibition

|-
!colspan=12| Non-Conference Regular Season

|-
!colspan=12| SEC Regular Season
|-

|-

|-
!colspan=12| 2012 SEC tournament

|-
!colspan=12| National Invitation Tournament

References 

Mississippi State
Mississippi State Bulldogs men's basketball seasons
Mississippi State
Bull
Bull